Flaveria campestris, common name alkali yellowtops, is a plant species native to the southwestern United States and to the southern Great Plains (Arizona, Utah, New Mexico, Colorado, Texas, Missouri, Kansas, Oklahoma). It is found on saline soils and on the margins of lakes, ponds and streams.

Flaveria campestris is an annal herb up to 90 cm (3 feet) tall. It produces a tightly packed corymb of up to 100 small flower heads. Flowers are yellow, sometimes lacking ray flowers, other times with only a single ray flower per head. Each head has 5-8 disc flowers.

References

External links
SEINet Southwestern Biodiversity, Arizona chapter

campestris
Flora of the United States
Flora of the Great Plains (North America)
Flora of the South-Central United States
Plants described in 1903
Flora without expected TNC conservation status